Guillermo Antonio Ameer is the Daniel Hale Williams Professor of biomedical engineering at the Robert R. McCormick School of Engineering and Applied Science and Surgery at the Feinberg School of Medicine of Northwestern University and is a fellow of the American Institute for Medical and Biological Engineering, the Biomedical Engineering Society,  the American Institute of Chemical Engineers, the American Association for the Advancement of Science, and the Materials Research Society.  He is an engineer, inventor, and entrepreneur.

Early life
Ameer was born in Panama. He immigrated to the United States with his brother in 1988 where he settled in New York City. Later on, he moved to Texas where he began attending Collin College and the University of Texas at Austin where he majored in chemical engineering. Ameer was an intern at  Hoechst Celanese and a summer operator at Shell Oil Company. He earned his Sc.D. in chemical engineering at the Massachusetts Institute of Technology where he studied with biotechnology pioneer Robert Langer. Following the degree, he pursued postdoctoral studies at MIT and the Department of Pathology of Harvard University where he worked with Hidde Ploegh and William Harmon.

Research
In 2018 Ameer's team developed a regenerative bandage which is designed to heal diabetic foot ulcers. The bandage is a liquid that upon contact with the injured tissue turns to a gel. 

In 2018, he helped established the Center for Advanced Regenerative Engineering (CARE) and currently serves as its director. Vadim Backman, Nathan C. Gianneschi, Mark Hersam, Chad Mirkin, Milan Mrksich, Teri W. Odom, Susan Quaggin, John A. Rogers, and Clyde Yancy are associated with CARE.

Fellowships and awards
2004 - Awarded the Arnold and Mabel Beckman Foundation Young Investigators Award
2006 - Awarded the National Science Foundation CAREER Award
2009 - Fellow of the American Institute for Medical and Biological Engineering
2014 - Fellow of the Biomedical Engineering Society
2017 - Founding board member of the Regenerative Engineering Society
2017 - Elected fellow of the American Institute of Chemical Engineers
2018 - Received the "Key to the City", Panama City, Panama
2018 - Elected fellow of the American Association for the Advancement of Science
2019 - Martin E. And G. Gertrude G. Walder Award for Research Excellence 
2019 - Fellow of the National Academy of Inventors
2020 - Awarded the Clemson Award for Contributions to the Literature by the Society for Biomaterials
2021 - Fellow of the Materials Research Society
2021 - Elected to the National Academy of Medicine
2022 - Awarded the Technology Innovation and Development Award by the Society For Biomaterials

References

External links

20th-century births
Living people
American biomedical engineers
American chemical engineers
Cockrell School of Engineering alumni
MIT School of Engineering alumni
Harvard Medical School faculty
Northwestern University faculty
Fellows of the American Institute for Medical and Biological Engineering
Fellows of the American Institute of Chemical Engineers
Fellows of the Biomedical Engineering Society
Year of birth missing (living people)
Panamanian emigrants to the United States
American scientists
Members of the National Academy of Medicine